Eugene Washington (born Eugene Washington Norman Walker; 7 August 1974) is a British actor of stage and screen.

Early life
Washington was born in Hammersmith, London, England, UK.

Career
He was last seen on stage in 2010 playing the title role in Shakespeare's Othello in a 9-month world tour in a joint venture for American Drama Group Europe (ADGE) and TNT Theatre, which saw him perform to audiences in Israel, Japan, Switzerland, Germany, Luxembourg, Austria, Norway, Sweden, Denmark, Isle of Man, Jersey, Costa Rica, El Salvador and China.

Eugene has also played the part of Henry Angell in Agatha Christie's The Unexpected Guest (No.1 UK Tour) alongside Casualty's Simon MacCorkindale and EastEnders''' Dean Gaffney for Bill Kenwright Ltd (making Eugene the first black actor to star in a professional Agatha Christie production in the UK).

He also played Dog Fox in The Lion, the Witch and the Wardrobe for The Royal Shakespeare Company in Stratford-upon-Avon and was in the cast for the world premiere of Howard Brenton's play Paul at the Royal National Theatre.

Eugene's screen credits include Law & Order: UK, Casualty, plus an appearance in the 2006 season of Doctor Who in an episode entitled "School Reunion", playing a creepy alien teacher named Mr. Wagner. He has also appeared in Doctors, Judge John Deed and had a lead guest role as Captain Rogan in Star Hyke'' in an episode entitled "Lucy In The Sky".

Personal life
Eugene graduated from The Academy Drama School, London in 2001.

Filmography

Film

Television

External links 
 

Washington, E
Living people
Alumni of the Academy Drama School
English male stage actors
English male film actors
English male television actors
Black British male actors
1978 births